, is a Japanese television series produced by Tsuburaya Productions. It is the 25th entry to the Ultra Series, released to celebrate the company's 50th anniversary. It is the first entry in the New Generation series, ending a six year long hiatus of live action shows produced in Japan after Ultraman Mebius concluded in 2007. It aired as part of the New Ultraman Retsuden programming block on TV Tokyo from July 10, 2013 to December 18, 2013. A second season titled Ultraman Ginga S aired in 2014.

Story

Hikaru fights with his friends to uncover the darkness behind the Spark Dolls. Alien Nackie drops a clue that the wielder of darkness resides in their very elementary school.

In the final episode, the master of darkness, Dark Lugiel reveals himself. He destroys the elementary school before proceeding to defeat Ginga. When all hope seems lost, Ultraman Taro regains his true form and rises to fight Dark Lugiel. He manages to revive Ginga before being defeated himself, and Ginga and Lugiel have an intense battle on the moon, ending with Lugiel's defeat. Ginga and Taro say their goodbyes to Hikaru and friends as they leave Earth for their homeland.

Episodes

Extra:

Films
 is the first film adaptation of this series. It was released on September 7, 2013, as a double-bill with Mega Monster Rush: Ultra Frontier - Dino-Tank Hunting. Chronologically it takes place between Episode 6 & 7.
 is the second film adaptation of this series. It was released on March 15, 2014, as a double-bill with Mega Monster Rush: Ultra Frontier - Verokron Hunting. Chronologically it takes place at some point in time after the final episode.

Cast
: 
: 
: 
: 
: 
: 
: 
: 
: 
: 
: 
: 
: 
, : 
: 
: 
Ginga Spark Voice, Dark Spark Voice:

Guest cast

:

Songs
Opening theme

Lyrics & Composition: 
Arrangement: Toshihiko Takamizawa with 
Artist: Takamiy with 
Episodes: 1-6 (Verse 1), 7-11, Extra (Verse 2)
Ending theme
"Starlight"
Lyrics & Composition & Arrangement: 
Artist: 
Episodes: 1-6, Extra (Verse 1), 7-11 (Verse 2)
Insert theme

Lyrics: , 
Composition & Arrangement: 
Episodes: 1-3, 6, 7, 10, 11, Extra

Lyrics: Maria Haruna
Composition & Arrangement: Takao Konishi
Artist: Chisa (Girl Next Door), Maria Haruna, Chigusa (Kirara)
Episodes: 4, Extra

Lyrics: 
Composition and arrangement: 
Artist: , 
Final episode

See also
 Ultra Series - Complete list of official Ultraman-related shows
 Ultraman Ginga S - A sequel to the show

References

External links
Ultraman Ginga at Tsuburaya Productions 

2013 Japanese television series debuts
Ultra television series
Crossover tokusatsu television series
TV Tokyo original programming